Classic Hits Live is a live album from the Kottonmouth Kings released on August 12, 2003. They recorded one song from every city of the tour for this 2 disc cd.

Track listing

Disc One

Disc Two

References 

2003 live albums
Kottonmouth Kings albums
Suburban Noize Records live albums